The 2018 Cooper Tires USF2000 Championship Powered by Mazda was the ninth season – since its revival in 2010 – of the U.S. F2000 National Championship, an open wheel auto racing series that is the first step in INDYCAR's Road to Indy ladder, operated by Andersen Promotions. A 14-race schedule was announced on October 17, 2017.

American Kyle Kirkwood driving for Cape Motorsports in a single-car effort dominated the championship, winning twelve of the fourteen races. The only other driver to win was two consecutive races won by former Indy Lights competitor Alexandre Baron for Swan-RJB Motorsports early in the season. Baron left the series after seven races. Swede Rasmus Lindh finished well back in second place driving for Pabst Racing who won the team championship in a close battle. Lindh didn't capture a second place finish until the final race of the season. Just behind Lindh were Brazilians Lucas Kohl and Igor Fraga. Fourteen drivers competed in all fourteen races.

Drivers and teams

Schedule

Race results

Championship standings
Scoring system

 One point is awarded to the driver who qualifies on pole position.
 One point is awarded to the driver who leads the most laps in the race.
 One point is awarded to the driver who sets the fastest lap during the race.

Drivers' Championship

Teams' championship
Scoring system

Single car teams receive 3 bonus points as an equivalency to multi-car teams
Only the best two results count for teams fielding more than two entries

See also
2018 IndyCar Series
2018 Indy Lights
2018 Pro Mazda Championship

References

See also
2018 IndyCar Series
2018 Indy Lights
2018 Pro Mazda Championship

External links
 

U.S. F2000 National Championship
U.S. F2000 National Championship